Sarah E. Gorham (1832–1894) was the first woman to be sent out as a missionary from the African Methodist Episcopal Church. Her life is not documented until 1880, when she visited family members who had moved to Liberia, presumably via the American Colonization Society. While there, she became interested in the people of the area and the programs of the missionaries. She has been described as a "missionary, church leaders, social worker". After this visit, she returned to the United States and was involved at the Charles Street African Methodist Episcopal Church. In 1888, at the age of 56, she went to the Magbelle mission in Sierra Leone (about 75 miles from Freetown), as the AME's first woman foreign missionary.  At Magbele she established the Sarah Gorham Mission School, which gave both religious and industrial training. In July 1894 she was bedridden with malaria and died the next month.  She was buried in the Kissy Road Cemetery in Freetown, Sierra Leone.

Notes

Further reading
Anderson, Gerald H. 1998. Biographical Dictionary of Christian Missions. W. B. Eerdmans Publishing Company, Grand Rapids, Michigan. Web access.
Berry, Lewellyn L. 1942. A Century of Missions of the African Methodist Episcopal Church, 1840-1940. New York.
Dandridge, Octavia. 1987. A History of the Women's Missionary Society of the African Methodist Episcopal Church.
Campbell, James T. 1995. Songs of Zion: The African Methodist Episcopal Church in the United States and South Africa. Oxford University Press.
Keller, Rosemary Skinner, Louise L. Queen, and Hilah F. Thomas, eds. 1982. Women in New Worlds. Nashville: Abingdon.

1832 births
1894 deaths
Female Christian missionaries
Methodist missionaries in Sierra Leone
African-American missionaries
American Methodist missionaries
American expatriates in Sierra Leone
19th-century African-American women